TMCM may refer to:

 Taiwan Metal Creation Museum, a museum in Tainan, Taiwan
 Too Much Coffee Man, an American satirical superhero